Gayathri is a 1973 Indian Malayalam film, directed by P. N. Menon. The film stars Jayabharathi, Raghavan, MG Soman and Shubha in the lead roles. The film had musical score by G. Devarajan. M G Soman made his debut in this movie.

Cast
Raghavan
M. G. Soman
Jayabharathi
Adoor Bhasi
Sankaradi
Shubha
Bahadoor
Kottarakkara Sreedharan Nair
Roja Ramani
Janardhanan

Soundtrack

References

External links
 

1973 films
1970s Malayalam-language films
Best Malayalam Feature Film National Film Award winners
Films directed by P. N. Menon (director)